Club de Fútbol Badalona is a Spanish football team based in Badalona, in the autonomous community of Catalonia. Founded in 1903 it plays in Tercera Federación – Group 5, temporarily holding home games at Estadi Municipal de Badalona, with a capacity of 4,170 seats.

History
Badalona was founded in 1903 as Football Bétulo Club, being renamed FC Badalona five years later. It played 14 seasons in the second division (1934–36, 1939–41, 1947–52, 1963–68), but this was prior to the creation of the intermediate Segunda División B.

As the club was constantly in economical problems, having to battle for the people's preference with basketball side Joventut Badalona, it nearly disappeared in the early 2000s (as the side was on the verge of celebrating 100 years) but, after another merge, this time with Unió de l'Esport Badaloní, resurfaced and changed names to Club de Fútbol Badalona – with the latter preserving its history – eventually making its debut in the (new) third level in 2004.

In January 2015, its home ground since 1936, the 10,000 seat Camp del Centenari, was demolished and the club was relocated temporarily to Camp de Montigalà, until the completion of the new 4,100 seat Estadi Municipal de Badalona, inaugurated on 29 January 2017. Average attendance for their home games has been 946 in 2018–19 and 947 in 2019–20.

The club finished 7th in Segunda División B, Group 3 in the 2018–19 season. Badalona had a solid performance at home, having lost only 4 of 19 matches at the Estadi Municipal. The club finished 19th in the COVID-19 shortened 2019–20 season, winning only 3 of their 12 home games, but was not be relegated to Tercera División as the Royal Spanish Football Federation revoked all relegations due to the incomplete (3/4 of games were played) season.

On 19 July 2022, Badalona absorbed UE Costa Brava. As the club was relegated to Tercera Federación, Costa Brava changed name to Club de Fútbol Badalona Futur, with the original Badalona acting as a reserve team.

Season to season

14 seasons in Segunda División
17 seasons in Segunda División B
1 season in Segunda División RFEF
40 seasons in Tercera División
1 season in Tercera Federación
18 seasons in Categorías Regionales

Honours
Copa Federación de España
Winners: 2003–04

Players

Current squad

Notable players

Famous coaches
  Ramón Calderé
  Josep Escolà

References

External links
Official website 
Futbolme team profile 
Club & stadium history - España de Espana 

 
Football clubs in Catalonia
Association football clubs established in 1903
Sport in Badalona
1903 establishments in Catalonia
Segunda División clubs